The Toronto South Detention Centre  is a correctional facility in the district of Etobicoke in Toronto, Ontario, Canada. It is a Government of Ontario-operated maximum-security correctional facility for adult male inmates serving a sentence of up to 2-years-less-a-day, and offenders who have been remanded into custody while awaiting trial. It is built on the site of the former Mimico Correctional Centre, which closed in 2011 and whose origins dated back to 1887.  
The Toronto South Detention Centre officially opened on January 29, 2014 replacing the Toronto Jail, the Toronto West Detention Centre, and the demolished Mimico Correctional Centre.

Facilities
The facility consists of two parts; A maximum-security building that can house up to 1,650 remanded offenders awaiting trial, and a medium-security building, known as the Toronto Intermittent Centre (TIC) that can house up to 320 inmates serving primarily weekend or other intermittent sentences. The maximum-security building is the first in Ontario to be constructed from prefabricated concrete cells that can be stacked with a minimal support structure. Designed by Zeidler Partnership Architects, the modular cell units were built and shipped from Tindall Corporation facility in Atlanta, Georgia.

History 
On May 9, 2008, the then Ministry of Community Safety and Correctional Services announced plans to build a new, larger correctional centre on the site of the Mimico Correctional Centre, which would replace the Mimico Correctional Centre, the Toronto (Don) Jail, and the Toronto West Detention Centre. The existing correctional centre closed on December 5, 2011, and Phase 1 of the new facility, the 320-bed Toronto Intermittent Centre began accepting prisoners on December 9, 2011. The old correctional centre buildings were then demolished to make room for Phase 2 of the Toronto South Detention Centre, which was completed in November 2012. The Toronto South Detention Centre (Phase 2) officially opened on January 29, 2014.

Operational problems
The facility is currently, as of June 2015, operating at half capacity with approximately 800 inmates. Nevertheless, due to staffing shortages, lockdowns have been more frequent than in other provincial jails occurring each weekend and frequently during the week as well and the centre's infirmary and gymnasium have remained closed since the facility became operational in 2014. The facility's mental health assessment unit did not become operational until after two inmates died in custody in February 2015, one by suicide and another due to a drug overdose.

Notable inmates
Peter Nygard - Finnish-Canadian Fashion designer is currently incarcerated there for sex crimes.

See also 
 List of correctional facilities in Ontario

References

External links 
 History of the Mimico Correctional Centre
 Ontario Ministry of Community Safety and Correctional Services
 Life Inside Jail - Toronto South Detention Centre http://www.lifeinsidejail.com/

Prisons in Ontario
Buildings and structures in Toronto
Etobicoke
Public–private partnership projects in Canada